The 2020 Czech Cycling Tour was the 11th edition of the Czech Cycling Tour, between 6 and 9 August 2020. The race was rated as a 2.1 event as part of the 2020 UCI Europe Tour.

Route

Teams
Twenty teams, consisting of six UCI WorldTeams, four UCI ProTeams, ten UCI Continental teams, and the Czech national team, participated in the race.

UCI WorldTeams

 
 
 
 
 
 

UCI ProTeams

 
 
 
 

UCI Continental Teams

 
 
 
 
 
 
 
 
 
 

National Teams

 Czech Republic

Stages

Stage 1
6 August 2020 — Uničov to Uničov,

Stage 2
7 August 2020 — Prostějov to Uničov,

Stage 3
8 August 2020 — Olomouc to Frýdek-Místek,

Stage 4
9 August 2020 — Mohelnice to Šternberk,

Classification leadership table
In the 2020 Czech Cycling Tour, four jerseys were awarded. The general classification was calculated by adding each cyclist's finishing times on each stage. The leader of the general classification received a yellow jersey, sponsored by the Olomouc Region and Moravian-Silesian Region, and the winner of this classification is considered the winner of the race.

The second classification was the points classification. Riders were awarded points for finishing in the top fifteen in a stage. Points were also on offer at intermediate sprints. The leader of the points classification wore a green jersey, sponsored by Satum.

There was also a mountains classification for which points were awarded for reaching the top of a climb before other riders. The climbs were categorized, in order of increasing difficulty, as third, second and first-category. The leader of the mountains classification wore a polkadot jersey, sponsored by Emco.

The fourth jersey was a classification for young riders classification, marked by a white jersey sponsored by the Best of British Cars (Jaguar, Land Rover). Only Hungarian riders were eligible and they were ranked according to their placement in the general classification of the race.

The final classification was the team classification, for which the times of the best three cyclists in each team on each stage was added together; the leading team at the end of the race was the team with the lowest cumulative time.

Final classification standings

General classification

Points classification

Mountains classification

Young rider classification

Teams classification

See also

 2020 in men's road cycling
 2020 in sports

References

Sources

External links

Czech Cycling Tour
Czech Cycling Tour
Czech Cycling Tour